Ostankino Television Technical Center is a television studio and technical center in Moscow, Russia for Channel One Russia. The center provides ongoing technical support to multiple broadcasters in the country.

Construction
The thirteen story building of the Ostankino television complex is constructed of glass and concrete. The end of the building, facing the direction of the Ostankino pond, is different from all the other sides. The building volume exceeds 1 million cubic meters. The total height of the building is 52 meters and it has a useful area of 154 thousand square meters.

Famous shows televised in the building 
 Evening with Vladimir Solovyov 
 Let's Get Married (Russia)

See also 
 Ostankino Tower

References

External links

  

Television in Russia
Television in the Soviet Union
Buildings and structures built in the Soviet Union